Vladimir Georgiyevich Repyev (July 11, 1956 – January 4, 2009) was a Soviet/Russian handball player who competed in the 1980 Summer Olympics. In 1980 he won the silver medal with the Soviet team. He played one match.

References

Profile

1956 births
2009 deaths
Soviet male handball players
Russian male handball players
Handball players at the 1980 Summer Olympics
Olympic handball players of the Soviet Union
Olympic silver medalists for the Soviet Union
Olympic medalists in handball
Medalists at the 1980 Summer Olympics
Burials in Troyekurovskoye Cemetery